Climber may refer to:
Climber, a participant in the activity of climbing
Climber, general name for a vine
Climber, or climbing specialist, a road bicycle racer who can ride especially well on highly inclined roads
Climber (BEAM), a robot that goes upward or downward on a track 
Climber (video game), by Nintendo
Climber (magazine), a British magazine dedicated to sport climbing
Climber Motor Company, a  motor vehicle manufacturer in Arkansas
Climbers (novel), a 1989 novel by M. John Harrison
The Climber (1917 film), a silent drama film
The Climber  (1966 film), a Yugoslav drama film
The Climber  (1975 film), an Italian crime film
The Climber (album), an album by Judge Smith
Dynamic Sport Climber, a Polish paramotor design
The Climber, or Kokou no Hito, a Japanese climbing manga

See also
Climbing (disambiguation)
The Climbers (disambiguation)
Crazy Climber, a 1980 coin-operated arcade game
Ice Climber, a 1984 video game by Nintendo
List of climbers